Milorad Ratković (Serbian Cyrillic: Милорад Paткoвић; born 15 October 1964 in Zenica) is a Bosnian-Herzegovinian retired football player.

Club career
During his successful playing career he played for the Yugoslav clubs NK Čelik Zenica, Red Star Belgrade, FK Borac Banja Luka and Spanish sides Celta de Vigo and Sevilla FC. He played 134 games in 6 years with Celta and won a runner-up medal in the 1994 Copa del Rey when he played alongside compatriot Vladimir Gudelj and Spanish international goalkeeper Santiago Cañizares.

Post-playing career
As of 2020, he works as a scout for Celta.

References

External links
http://www.lfp.es/historico/primera/plantillas/historial.asp?jug=5828

1964 births
Living people
Sportspeople from Zenica
Serbs of Bosnia and Herzegovina
Association football midfielders
Yugoslav footballers
Bosnia and Herzegovina footballers
NK Čelik Zenica players
Red Star Belgrade footballers
FK Borac Banja Luka players
RC Celta de Vigo players
Sevilla FC players
Yugoslav First League players
La Liga players
Bosnia and Herzegovina expatriate footballers
Expatriate footballers in Spain
Bosnia and Herzegovina expatriate sportspeople in Spain